Tassajara may refer to: 
 Tassajara, California, in Contra Costa County
 Tassajara Formation
 Tassajara Hot Springs
 Tassajara Hot Springs, California
 Tassajara Zen Mountain Center
 Tassajara - mountain bike design by Gary Fisher
 Tassajara Cellars - winery in Paso Robles, California
 Tassajara Creek (Arroyo Seco River) - tributary of the Arroyo Seco River (Monterey County), in the Ventana Wilderness
 Tassajara Creek - creek in the Morgan Territory Regional Preserve in Alameda County, California
 Tassajara Mountain or Mount Tassajara - peak in the Santa Lucia Mountains
Tassajara- famous vegetarian restaurant